A Foehn or Föhn, is a type of dry, relatively warm, downslope wind that occurs in the lee (downwind side) of a mountain range.
It is a rain shadow wind that results from the subsequent adiabatic warming of air that has dropped most of its moisture on windward slopes (see orographic lift). As a consequence of the different adiabatic lapse rates of moist and dry air, the air on the leeward slopes becomes warmer than equivalent elevations on the windward slopes. 

Foehn winds can raise temperatures by as much as 14 °C (25 °F) in just a matter of hours. Switzerland, southern Germany and Austria have a warmer climate due to the Foehn, as moist winds off the Mediterranean Sea blow over the Alps.

Etymology
The name Foehn arose in the Alpine region. In the Southern Alps, the phenomenon is known as Föhn but also  and fen in Serbo-Croatian and Slovene. The German word Föhn (pronounced the same way) also means "hairdryer", while the word Fön is a genericized trademark today owned by AEG. The form phon is used in French-speaking parts of Switzerland as well as in Italy.

The name "Föhn" was originally used to refer to the south wind which blows during the winter months and brings thaw conditions to the northern side of the Alps. Because Föhn later became a generic term that was extended to other mountain ranges around the world that experience similar phenomena, the name "Alpine föhn" (Alpenföhn) was coined for the Föhns of the Alpine region.

Causes 

There are four known causes of the Foehn warming and drying effect. These mechanisms often act together, with their contributions varying depending on the size and shape of the mountain barrier and on the meteorological conditions, such as the upstream wind speed, temperature and humidity.

Condensation and precipitation
When winds blow over elevated terrain, air forced upwards expands and cools due to the decrease in pressure with height. Since colder air can hold less water vapour, moisture condenses to form clouds and precipitates as rain or snow on the mountain's upwind slopes. The change of state from vapour to liquid water releases latent heat energy which heats the air, partially countering the cooling that occurs as the air rises. The subsequent removal of moisture as precipitation renders this heat gain by the air irreversible, leading to the warm, dry, Foehn conditions as the air descends in the mountain's lee. This mechanism has become a popular textbook example of atmospheric thermodynamics. However, the common occurrence of 'dry' Foehn events, where there is no precipitation, implies there must be other mechanisms.

Isentropic draw-down
Isentropic draw-down is the draw-down of warmer, drier air from aloft. When the approaching winds are insufficiently strong to propel the low-level air up and over the mountain barrier, the airflow is said to be 'blocked' by the mountain and only air higher up near mountain-top level is able to pass over and down the lee slopes as Foehn winds. These higher source regions provide Foehn air that becomes warmer and drier on the leeside after it is compressed with descent due to the increase in pressure towards the surface.

Mechanical mixing
When river water passes over rocks, turbulence is generated in the form of rapids, and white water reveals the turbulent mixing of the water with the air above. Similarly, as air passes over mountains, turbulence occurs and the atmosphere is mixed in the vertical. This mixing generally leads to a downward warming and upward moistening of the cross-mountain airflow, and consequently to warmer, drier Foehn winds in the valleys downwind.

Radiative warming
Dry Foehn conditions are responsible for the occurrence of rain shadows in the lee of mountains, where clear, sunny conditions prevail. This often leads to greater daytime radiative (solar) warming under Foehn conditions. This type of warming is particularly important in cold regions where snow or ice melt is a concern or where avalanches are a risk.

Effects 

Winds of this type are also called "snow-eaters" for their ability to make snow and ice melt or sublimate rapidly. This is a result not only of the warmth of Foehn air, but also its low relative humidity. Accordingly, Foehn winds are known to contribute to the disintegration of ice shelves in the polar regions.

Foehn winds are notorious among mountaineers in the Alps, especially those climbing the Eiger, for whom the winds add further difficulty in ascending an already difficult peak.

They are also associated with the rapid spread of wildfires, making some regions which experience these winds particularly fire-prone.

Purported physiological effects 
Anecdotally, residents in areas of frequent Foehn winds have reported experiencing a variety of illnesses ranging from migraines to psychosis. The first clinical review of these effects was published by the Austrian physician Anton Czermak in the 19th century. A study by the Ludwig-Maximilians-Universität München found that suicide and accidents increased by 10 percent during Foehn winds in Central Europe. The causation of Föhnkrankheit (English: Foehn-sickness) is unproven. Labels for preparations of aspirin combined with caffeine, codeine and the like will sometimes include Föhnkrankheit amongst the indications. Evidence for effects from Chinook winds remain anecdotal.

In some regions, Foehn winds are associated with causing circulatory problems, headaches, or similar ailments. Researchers have found, however, the Foehn wind's warm temperature to be beneficial to humans in most situations, and have theorised that the reported negative effects may be a result of secondary factors, such as changes in the electrical field or in the ion state of the atmosphere, the wind's relatively low humidity, or the generally unpleasant sensation of being in an environment with strong and gusty winds.

Local examples 

Regionally, these winds are known by many different names. These include:
in Africa
 Bergwind in South Africa

in the Americas
The Brookings Effect on the southwestern coast of Oregon, also known as the Chetco Effect.
 Chinook winds east of the Rocky Mountains and the Cascade Range in the United States and Canada, and north, east and west of the Chugach Mountains of Alaska, United States
 Foehn winds in the foothills of the southern Appalachian mountains, which can be unusual compared to other Foehn winds in that the relative humidity typically changes little due to the increased moisture in the source air mass
The Santa Ana winds of southern California, including the Sundowner winds of Santa Barbara, are in some ways similar to the Föhn, but originate in dry deserts as a katabatic wind.
Puelche wind in Chile
Suêtes on the west coast of Cape Breton Island, Nova Scotia, Canada
Wreckhouse winds in the southwest corner of the island of Newfoundland, Newfoundland and Labrador, Canada
Zonda winds in Argentina

in Antarctica
 Föhn wall on Signy Island, South Orkneys

in Asia
 Garmesh, Garmij, Garmbaad: in Gilan region (near the Alborz) in the south west of Caspian Sea in Iran. 
 In winter, a Foehn effect occurs in the West Azerbaijan province, Iran (around Lake Urmia) as manifested by the province's dry winters relative to those in the windward part of the region (Northern Iraq or Kurdistan Region and Hakkâri Province in Turkey). For example, the winter rainfall of Urmia and Salmas in Iranian Azerbaijan is much lower than Batifa and Soran in Iraqi Kurdistan, and Hakkâri in the Hakkâri Province, which are roughly on the same latitude but are on the windward side of the Zagros mountains.
 Loo in Indo-Gangetic Plain
Warm Braw in the Schouten Islands north of West Papua, Indonesia.
Wuhan in China is famously known as one of the Three Furnaces on account of its extremely hot weather in summer resulting from the adiabatic warming effect created by mountains further south.
Laos wind, hot-dry west wind in northern and central Vietnam.

in Europe

 Favonio in Ticino and north-western Italy due to western and northern winds crossing the Alps (mostly in winter)
Garbino in the Adriatic coast of Italy due to south-western winds crossing the Apennine Mountains (mostly in fall and winter)
 Fen in northwest Slovenia
 Fønvind in South Norway, in particular Central Norway, resulting in extreme winter warming, including Scandinavia's warmest winter temperature in Sunndalsøra.
 Fogony in the Catalan Pyrenees
 Föhn or Foehn in Austria, southern Germany, Switzerland, France and Liechtenstein
Föhn in Ostrobothnia and Western Lapland in Finland as moist air crosses Scandinavian Mountains and dries up.
 Halny in the Carpathian Mountains, Poland (Central Europe)
The Helm Wind, on the Pennines in the Eden Valley, Cumbria, England
Hnjúkaþeyr in Icelandic
Lodos wind, causing warm temperatures in the leeward side of mountains in the mild-winter climates of the Aegean Sea, Greece and Turkey, as well as unusually mild temperatures in locales north of the Marmara Sea such as Istanbul, Izmit and Adapazarı.
Livas wind in the Thessalian plain, Boeotia plain, Plain of Thessaloniki, Elefsina and Athens in Greece
Košava (Koshava) wind in Serbia that blows along the Danube River
Nortada in Cascais, and most notoriously in Guincho Beach, making it one of the best windsurfing spots in Europe
Ponentà in Valencia (eastern Spain)
Terral in Málaga (southern Spain)
Vântul Mare in the Carpathian Mountains, Romania
Viento del Sur (Southern Wind) or Hego haizea in Basque in the Cantabrian region (northern Spain)

in Oceania
The Great Dividing foehn in southeast Australia, leeward of the Great Dividing Range, observed in the coastal plains of New South Wales, and also in eastern Victoria and eastern Tasmania.
The Nor'wester in Hawkes Bay, Canterbury, and Otago, New Zealand

In popular culture 
 The Foehn was mentioned by Queen's lead guitarist Brian May while talking about the band's grim Munich recording studio experience in 1982.
 The foehn is attributed by the narrator of Jens Bjørneboe's 1966 novel Frihetens øyeblikk (Moment of Freedom) as the traditional cause of occasional unprovoked murders in a small Alpine town.
 "Foehn" is the last word in A Nest of Ninnies, a 1969 novel by John Ashbery and James Schuyler. Ashbery claimed that he and Schuyler chose this particular word because "people, if they bothered to, would have to open the dictionary to find out what the last word in the novel meant."
Fønfjord, meaning "Foehn Fjord," was named by Arctic explorer Carl Ryder after the powerful Foehn wind gusts blowing during the first exploration of the fjord in August 1891.

Gallery

See also 
 Alpine climate
 Anabatic wind
 Föhn cloud
 Katabatic winds
 Lee wave
 Meteorology

References 
 McKnight, TL & Hess, Darrel (2000). "Foehn/Chinook Winds". In Physical Geography: A Landscape Appreciation, p. 132. Upper Saddle River, NJ: Prentice Hall. .

Footnotes

External links 

 Photo of Föhnmauer The strong clouds at the mountain ridges where the Föhn winds form are called Föhnmauer (Föhn wall).
 Illustration
 Movie of a Föhn situation in the Swiss Alps
 East Scotland warmth due to Foehn Effect
 Foehn chart provided by meteomedia/meteocentrale.ch

Föhn effect
Mountain meteorology
Weather and health
Wind
Winds

cs:Místní názvy větrů#Fén